Philomusaea is a genus of moths in the family Oecophoridae.

Species
Philomusaea brachyxista Meyrick, 1931
Philomusaea craterias Meyrick, 1931
Philomusaea elissa Meyrick, 1931
Philomusaea incommoda Meyrick, 1931
Philomusaea meniscogramma (Clarke, 1978)

References

 
Oecophorinae
Moth genera